Sangamner taluka, is a taluka in Sangamner subdivision of Ahmednagar district in Maharashtra State of India.

Area
The table below shows area of the taluka by land type.

Ranjangao
There are around 172 villages in Sangamner taluka. For list of villages see Villages in Sangamner taluka.

Population
The table below shows population  of the taluka by sex. The data is as per 2001 census.

Rain Fall
The Table below details of rainfall from year 1981 to 2004.

Notable people
Indurikar Maharaj - comedian kirtankar, and social educator
Ajinkya Rahane, Indian cricketer born at Ashwi Khurd village, Sangmner on 6 June 1988.

See also
 Talukas in Ahmednagar district

References

Talukas in Ahmednagar district
Talukas in Maharashtra

mr:संगमनेर तालुका